Bagmati Zone ( Bāgmatī Añcal) was one of the fourteen zones of Nepal until the restoration of zones to Provinces. Its headquarters are Kathmandu. It was named after the Bagmati River. It was in the Central Development Region of Nepal. The districts are now all part of Bagmati Province. The zone contains the Kathmandu Valley with its conurbation of 4.5 million inhabitants.

Administrative subdivisions
Bagmati was divided into eight districts; since 2015 these districts have been redesignated as part of Bagmati Province.

See also
 Development Regions of Nepal (Former)
 List of zones of Nepal (Former)
 List of districts of Nepal

 
Zones of Nepal
Newar
2015 disestablishments in Nepal